New Hampshire Route 78 (abbreviated NH 78) is a  secondary state highway in Cheshire County, New Hampshire, United States. A northward extension of Massachusetts Route 78, NH 78 runs entirely within the town of Winchester from the state border to downtown, where it ends at New Hampshire Route 10 and New Hampshire Route 119.

Route description
NH 78 begins at the Massachusetts–New Hampshire state border where it meets the northern end of Massachusetts Route 78. The short highway runs for just under 3.5 miles northwest to downtown Winchester, where it ends at its intersection with NH 10 and NH 119. There are no major intersections between its endpoints.

Junction list

References

External links

 New Hampshire State Route 78 on Flickr

078
Transportation in Cheshire County, New Hampshire